Ralph Anderson may refer to:

Ralph Anderson (wide receiver) (1936–1960), American football player who played for the Los Angeles Chargers in 1960
Ralph Anderson (defensive back) (born 1949), American football defensive back who played in the National Football League in the 1970s
Ralph Anderson (architect) (1924–2010), architect, based in Seattle, Washington, United States
Ralph Anderson (politician) (1927–2019), Democratic Party member of the South Carolina Senate beginning in 1996
Ralph A. Anderson Jr. (1923–1990), architect, based in Houston, Texas, United States
Ralph G. Anderson (1923–2010), American engineer, farmer, and founder of engineering firm Belcan
Ralph J. Anderson (1888–1962), Justice of the Montana Supreme Court
Ralph Anderson, character in The Outsider (King novel)